Major League Baseball on Fox Sports Networks refers to Major League Baseball television coverage on the former chain of Fox Sports regional networks.

Background

Beginning in 1997, as part of the contract with Major League Baseball it had signed the year before. Fox entered a four-year joint venture with Liberty Media Cable worth $172 million. Its recently launched the cable sports network, Fox Sports Net and was given rights to two Thursday night games per week, one for the Eastern and Central time zones and one for the Mountain and Pacific time zones with no exclusivity.

For the 2000 and 2001 seasons, the Fox network's then-sister cable channel, Fox Family (later ABC Family, now Freeform) carried a weekly Major League Baseball game on Thursday nights (a game that had previously aired nationwide on Fox Sports Net from 1997 to 1999), as well as select postseason games from the Division Series.

After The Walt Disney Company's $2.9 billion acquisition of Fox Family in October 2001, the Thursday night cable television rights went to ESPN. Fox Sports Net's affiliates would however, continue to broadcast Major League Baseball games on a local basis until 2020. Come the start of the 2021 season, Fox Sports Networks were rebranded to Bally Sports following the Sinclair Broadcast Group's purchase of the Fox Corporation's regional sports channels.

From 2006 to 2006, Fox Sports Net also aired The FSN Baseball Report, which was a daily baseball analysis program aired during the Major League Baseball season.

League Championship Series coverage

For the first year of its exclusive six-year contract (2001), Fox did a split telecast (which had not been attempted since the ill-fated "Baseball Network" arrangement existed) for the League Championship Series. This meant that two games were played simultaneously on the same night, with one game airing on the Fox network and the other on the regional Fox Sports Net cable channel (depending on market, as some markets did not have a regional sports network with a relationship to FSN). The rationale behind the split-telecast was that because of the September 11 attacks, the entire post-season schedule was delayed by a week. Because of this, two Sunday LCS games came in conflict with a Fox NFL doubleheader. Fans and sports journalists were unimpressed with the situation and MLB commissioner Bud Selig vowed that it was a one-time deal necessitated by circumstance. However, in later years, Fox used split telecasts on a few occasions to keep the playoffs "on schedule" and maximize its prime time advertising revenue, and aired the second game on FX, which has virtually nationwide distribution on cable and satellite. This ensured that Fox did not have to air an LCS game on a weekday afternoon, when many viewers are unable to watch.

In , Game 5 of the NLCS and Game 4 of the ALCS were split between Fox and Fox Sports Net. This came off the heels of Fox airing an NFL doubleheader that particular day (October 21). In , Game 1 of the NLCS and Game 2 of the ALCS were split between Fox and Fox Sports Net. The regional split was done in order for Fox to avoid televising a weekday afternoon game. In , Game 1 of the NLCS and Game 2 of the ALCS were split between Fox and Fox Sports Net.

Theme music
NJJ Music composed the original MLB on Fox theme music in 1996. This theme music was used exclusively from June 1996 until early May 2007. In mid-May 2007, an updated version was unveiled, featuring a more jazzy feel and implementing a full orchestra instead of the synth elements used by the 1996 theme. For the 2007 postseason, a Jochen Flach-composed slow orchestral theme was unveiled, and was used alongside the new orchestral theme for the All-Star Game and postseason from the 2007 ALCS until the 2010 All-Star Game. Fox Saturday Baseball, including the prime time games starting in 2010, still used the 2007 version of the regular theme song exclusively.

During the 2009 season, some Fox Sports regional affiliates switched to the 2007 theme while others continued using the original 1996 theme. However, all regional affiliates began using the 2007 theme starting with the 2011 season.

Beginning with the 2010 postseason, both the 2007 theme and the Flach theme were replaced by the longtime NFL on Fox theme music, which began to be used for all Fox sporting events. However, starting in 2011 and continuing to today, various songs from the album Heroes: The Olympic Collection were used when going into commercial breaks during the All-Star Game, postseason, and other marquee games such as Red Sox-Yankees games.

In 2014, the 2007–2010 jazz theme was brought back for regular season MLB on FS1. The NFL theme was retained for MLB on Fox, including Fox Saturday Baseball, Baseball Night in America, the All-Star Game and all coverage of the postseason. However, occasionally one of the two themes was heard on telecasts that were designated for the other, implying that the designations are slightly fluid.

In 2020, MLB on Fox reintroduced the original 1996-2007 theme; Fox Sports regional affiliates continued to use the 2007-2010 theme until the network was rebranded to Bally Sports in 2021. As of the 2021 season, the original theme is now used for coverage of all games across both Fox and FS1.

Commentators

Play-by-play announcers for the FSN/Fox Family coverage included Kenny Albert, Thom Brennaman, Chip Caray, Josh Lewin, and Steve Physioc. Color analysts included Bob Brenly, Kevin Kennedy, Steve Lyons, and Jeff Torborg. Occasionally, FSN would simulcast a local-team feed of a game from one of its affiliated regional sports networks in lieu of a dedicated national production.

Former Fox Sports Networks owned-and-operated affiliates

After 21st Century Fox became acquired by the Walt Disney Company, the Fox Sports Networks were divested and were sold to Diamond Sports Group, a joint-venture between Sinclair Broadcasting Group and Entertainment Studios. All of the Fox Sports Networks are now rebranded as Bally Sports as of March 31, 2021.

Former regional rights holders

References

External links

Searchable Network TV Broadcasts

Fox Sports Networks
1997 American television series debuts
2020 American television series endings
1990s American television series
2000s American television series
2010s American television series
2020s American television series
Simulcasts
Fox Sports Networks original programming